Sinking Spring is a borough in Berks County, Pennsylvania, United States. The population was 4,008 at the 2010 census. Sinking Spring was given its name for a spring located in the center of town. The water in this spring would sink into the ground from time to time, giving the illusion that it had disappeared. The Sinking Spring area is served by the Wilson School District.

Geography

The Indians who first inhabited this area were the Lenni Lenape Indians (meaning the "original people").  The tribe in this immediate area was the Minsi or Wolf tribe. Indian inhabitants in the Sinking Spring area supposedly called the main spring as the sunken spring.  White settlers later called it the "sinking spring."

Penn Avenue is the main thoroughfare of Sinking Spring.  There is a stone monument in the 3800 block of Penn Avenue.  It was placed to identify "The Spring," which is said to periodically appear and disappear.  The Borough of Sinking Spring has a large number of underground streams that carve out limestone and form sinkholes; thus the name Sinking Spring.

The Borough of Sinking Spring was incorporated on March 13, 1913.

Climate

The borough has a hot-summer humid continental climate (Dfa) and average monthly temperatures range from 30.4 °F in January to 75.6 °F in July. The local hardiness zone is 6b bordering 7a.

Demographics

As of the census of 2000, there were 2,639 people, 1,233 households, and 748 families residing in the borough. The population density was 1,960.7 people per square mile (754.8/km2). There were 1,269 housing units at an average density of 942.8 per square mile (362.9/km2). The racial makeup of the borough was 95.76% White, 1.06% African American, 0.15% Native American, 0.80% Asian, 1.21% from other races, and 1.02% from two or more races. Hispanic or Latino of any race were 2.73% of the population.

There were 1,233 households, out of which 23.3% had children under the age of 18 living with them, 46.6% were married couples living together, 10.8% had a female householder with no husband present, and 39.3% were non-families. 33.0% of all households were made up of individuals, and 14.8% had someone living alone who was 65 years of age or older. The average household size was 2.14 and the average family size was 2.72.
 
In the borough the population was spread out, with 19.6% under the age of 18, 6.7% from 18 to 24, 30.6% from 25 to 44, 20.5% from 45 to 64, and 22.5% who were 65 years of age or older. The median age was 40 years. For every 100 females there were 89.9 males. For every 100 females age 18 and over, there were 89.2 males.

The median income for a household in the borough was $35,078, and the median income for a family was $50,064. Males had a median income of $36,875 versus $24,635 for females. The per capita income for the borough was $23,053. About 12.0% of families and 11.6% of the population were below the poverty line, including 18.9% of those under age 18 and 14.8% of those age 65 or over.

Business and industry
Several oil and gas pipeline, terminal, and distribution companies are located in Sinking Spring near the village of Montello.

The Sunoco Logistics Montello Complex is the company's Eastern Pipeline System headquarters, as well as a local trucking terminal and a major midstream terminal for refined products, mostly originating from the Philadelphia and Marcus Hook refineries.  Sunoco's pipelines out of Montello provide gasoline, diesel fuel, and heating oil to large markets in Pittsburgh, Buffalo, and Rochester, as well as smaller markets near Harrisburg, Altoona, Williamsport, Tamaqua, and Kingston in Pennsylvania and the Elmira/Corning area in New York state.

Also located in Sinking Spring is "Alcon Precision Device" facility, used for the production of disposable, single and multi-use medical devices. The devices are manufactured for eye surgeries around the world, including cataract and vit surgerie, including the scalpels and sutures used for such surgeries. Alcon is a division of one of the world's largest pharmaceutical companies, Novartis.

Transportation

U.S. Route 422 and Pennsylvania Route 724 are the numbered highways serving Sinking Spring. US 422 follows an east-west alignment along Penn Avenue through the center of the borough. PA 724 heads southeast from US 422 along Shillington Road across the southeastern portion of the borough. 

Sinking Spring is also served by BARTA bus Route 14.

Notable people 
 John H. Addams, was a politician and businessman 
 Kenny Brightbill, former NASCAR and professional dirt modified driver
 Lori and George Schappell, Conjoined twins, were born here
 Paul Specht, was an American dance bandleader popular in the 1920s
 Shane Stafford, former arena football quarterback

References

External links

 Borough of Sinking Spring

Populated places established in 1913
Boroughs in Berks County, Pennsylvania
1913 establishments in Pennsylvania